Santiago Hirsig (born January 12, 1978 in San Isidro) is a retired  Argentine footballer.

Career

Argentina
Hirsig started his career playing in the Argentine 2nd Division with Atlanta and then Club Atlético Platense before moving to Huracán in 2001.

At the end of the 2003 Clausura Huracán were relegated after a disastrous season and Hirsig was sold to Arsenal de Sarandí where Hirsig helped Arsenal to qualify for their first ever international tournament, the Copa Sudamericana in 2004. In 2006 Hirsig was signed by San Lorenzo.

United States
On February 11, 2009, the Kansas City Wizards of Major League Soccer announced they had signed Hirsig. After a disappointing spell in MLS, Hirsig moved back to Argentina with Quilmes.

Argentina
Hirsig played for Quilmes until he was released in June 2012.

Titles

References

External links
MLS player profile
 Argentine Primera statistics

1978 births
Living people
People from San Isidro, Buenos Aires
Argentine footballers
Argentine expatriate footballers
Association football midfielders
Club Atlético Atlanta footballers
Club Atlético Platense footballers
Argentine Primera División players
Club Atlético Huracán footballers
Arsenal de Sarandí footballers
San Lorenzo de Almagro footballers
Quilmes Atlético Club footballers
Sporting Kansas City players
Argentine people of German descent
Argentine expatriate sportspeople in the United States
Expatriate soccer players in the United States
Major League Soccer players
Sportspeople from Buenos Aires Province